Angelo Romani (12 April 1934 – January 8, 2003) was an Italian swimmer. He participated in three Olympic Games. He was the Italian record holder several times in different events. He was born in Pesaro, Italy and died in Milan, Italy.

Image gallery

See also
Italian record progression 100 metres freestyle
Italian record progression 200 metres freestyle

References

1934 births
2003 deaths
People from Pesaro
Italian male swimmers
Olympic swimmers of Italy
Swimmers at the 1952 Summer Olympics
Swimmers at the 1956 Summer Olympics
Swimmers at the 1960 Summer Olympics
European Aquatics Championships medalists in swimming
Swimmers at the 1955 Mediterranean Games
Sportspeople from the Province of Pesaro and Urbino